Governor Crawford may refer to:

Coe I. Crawford (1858–1944), 6th Governor of South Dakota
Frederick Crawford (colonial administrator) (1906–1978), Governor of Uganda from 1957 to 1961 and Governor of the Seychelles from 1951 to 1953
George W. Crawford (1798–1872), 38th Governor of Georgia
Samuel J. Crawford (1835–1913), 3rd Governor of Kansas